This is a list of tennis players who have represented the France Fed Cup team in an official Fed Cup match. France have taken part in the competition since 1963.

Players

References

External links
Fédération Française de Tennis

Tennis in France
Lists of Billie Jean King Cup tennis players